Eta Circini, Latinized from η Circini, is the Bayer designation for a solitary star located in the southern constellation of Circinus. It is faintly visible to the naked eye with an apparent visual magnitude of 5.17. The distance to this star, as determined from an annual parallax shift of 11.82 mas, is around 276 light years.

This is an evolved G-type giant star with a stellar classification of G8 III. It is radiating an estimated 64 times the solar luminosity from its outer atmosphere at an effective temperature of 4,954 K.

References

External links
http://server3.wikisky.org/starview?object_type=1&object_id=2194

Circini, Eta
Circinus (constellation)
Circini, Eta
132905
073776
5593
Durchmusterung objects